Fetichism in West Africa: Forty Years' Observation of Native Customs and Superstitions is a book by the Reverend Robert Hamill Nassau, a missionary, published in 1904. It is one of the earliest studies of traditional religion on West Africa.

The book relates the facts which Nassau discovered over the course of many years concerning traditional religions and the practice of sorcery in West Africa and how it related to the everyday lives of the people of that region. John Cinnamon suggests that 'when Nassau was able to refrain from the constant, invidious comparison between enlightened Christian truth and degraded African wickedness, his observations contain glimmers of ethnographic insight'.

A Mpongwe woman, Anyentyuwe, was one of Nassau's principal informants for Fetichism in West Africa. She was a teacher and servant at Baraka Mission, Gabon.

References

External links 
Fetichism in West Africa (entire text)

1904 non-fiction books
Occult books
Religious studies books
African witchcraft